Ron Aprea is a composer, arranger, producer, saxophonist, clarinetist, and flutist. He has performed with Woody Herman, Les Elgart, Tito Puente, Frank Foster, Buddy Morrow, Billy May, Charlie Persip, Nat Adderley, Lionel Hampton, and Louis Armstrong.

While with Hamp's band, some of the highlights were a Ramsey Lewis television special, and a recorded concert at the Smithsonian Institution, where Ron's solos were taped and put into their Archives. Ron was the featured soloist and arranger for performances with Nat Adderley at the world-famous Apollo Theatre, and he also performed at the Paramount Theatre with King Curtis' Big Band. Ron has played shows for hundreds of stars, including Clint Holmes, Rita Moreno, Robert Merrill, Chita Rivera, Rich Little, and Billy Eckstine.

In 1974, Ron recorded with John Lennon and Elton John on the album entitled Walls and Bridges. The all-star horn section included Howard Johnson, Frank Vicari, and Steve Madeo. Ron was a featured soloist on the jazz-gospel album Free to Be Free. He also wrote, arranged, and produced his own album, Ronnie April's Positive Energy Volume 1. Ron had his own TV special on WNYC, and was a featured soloist on Broadway's Song of Singapore.

Ron's compositions, arrangements, and productions skills can be heard on Angela DeNiro's first CD, Just For the Fun Of It, as well as her second  release, Angela DeNiro...Swingin' With Legends, featuring Lionel Hampton, Frank Foster, and Lew Tabackin.

Ron and Angela brought the house down at the Five Towns College Jazz Concert in 1998 and 1999. Ron was featured with the Kenny Barron Trio at the 1998 Lionel Hampton Jazz Festival, and was part of the All-Star cast, which included Frank Foster, Frank Wess, Bill Watrous, Jon Faddis, Al Grey, Ray Brown, Marion McPartland, Abbey Lincoln, and Diana Krall. In addition to a full performance schedule, Ron spends much time composing and arranging, both for an instrumental big band album, and for vocalist Angela DeNiro.

During the summer of '98, Ron performed extensively with both his Big Band and Quintet, and received a standing ovation from thousands at the Planting Fields Arboretum in New York, where he and Angela DeNiro again appeared as guest artists in concert with Lionel Hampton's Big Band. Ron's solos, and his impeccable "note-matching" with Angela at finger-breaking tempos during the scatting segments, wowed their audience!

In 1998, Ron's production of Angela DeNiro's "Swingin' With Legends" album, featuring Lionel Hampton, Frank Foster, Lew Tabackin,  and Ron's all-star 16 piece big band, received 8  GRAMMY nomination entries, 3 of which were: Producer of the Year, and Best Instrumental Arrangement Accompanying a Vocalist for Angela DeNiro's "Avalon" & "The Song Is You." On that historic album, Angela DeNiro became the first and only singer to record Midnight Sun with its composer, Lionel Hampton.

In January 2001, Ron's band, with Angela DeNiro, was featured on "BET-TV". The national program, called "Jazz Discovery", showcased jazz artists in competition, and was judged by a panel of three, which included jazz legend Chick Corea. Angela, with Ron's band, won.  Later that year, Ron completed an arranging assignment for vocalist Alex Donner, featuring nine of Ron's arrangements. Alex released the first of a 2-CD set in the spring of 2001. Ron co-hosted a weekly jazz radio show on WSHR, 91.9 FM, New York, with his wife, vocalist Angela DeNiro. Their show, Rush-Hour Rendezvous ran successfully for two years, and featured great jazz and musical conversation.

Ron and Angela DeNiro made a cameo appearance on legendary jazz vocalist Mark Murphy's album, entitled "Links," released in September 2001 on the High Note Label. In August 2001, Ron performed in an All-Star band for a Charlie Parker Birthday tribute in Harlem, New York. The band featured four alto saxophonists. Playing alongside Ron were Jimmy Zaff, Gerald Hayes, and James Spaulding. The rhythm section featured Danny Mixon on piano, Bob Cunningham on bass, and Andre Strobaer on drums.

Ron wrote for Angela DeNiro's third CD, "My Shining Hour."  One of Ron's compositions, "For Phil," is dedicated to Phil Woods, who has been a major source of inspiration to Ron since the mid 60's. Ron's tribute to Phil,  performed by Ms. DeNiro, exudes the warmth and love Ron has for the legendary alto saxophonist.  This CD was released in August 2005.  Angela and Ron were joined on this album by a smokin' rhythm section consisting of Cecilia Coleman on piano, Tim Givens on bass, and Jim Young on drums.  Trumpeter Don Sickler and trombonist Scott Whitfield join Ron's alto sax and flute, and strings rounded out two of the cuts on the album, featuring Matt Aprea on violin.

In 2007, Ron Aprea and his wife jazz vocalist Angela DeNiro headlined les Nuits du Jazz Festival, in Nantes France, and were featured with the Côte Ouest Big Band, under the direction of Jean-Phillipe Vidal.

On June 5, 2013 Ron released his own album entitled Ron Aprea Sextet-Remembering Blakey, Ron's tribute to Art Blakey and his Jazz Messengers. Ron's front line on this album is Joe Magnarelli-trpt., Jerry Weldon-tenor, and Ron on alto. The rhythm section is Cecilia Coleman-piano, Tim Givens-bass, and Vince Cherico-drums. The album is a mix of originals and standards. Ron has two of his own originals, Sophia (written for his granddaughter) and For Pete's Sake (written for the late bassist and close friend Pete Chivily.) Although none of the 12 cuts are tunes that Blakey recorded, Ron confesses that in writing for this project Blakey's Jazz Messengers kept popping into his head.

Future plans will include Ron's son Matt who is a violinist, and his wife, jazz vocalist Angela DeNiro.

References
 
 
 
 
 
 
 

Living people
Year of birth missing (living people)